Ken Pettway (born June 25, 1964) is a former American football defensive back who played six seasons in the Canadian Football League with the Winnipeg Blue Bombers and BC Lions. He played college football at University of California, Berkeley.

References

External links
Just Sports Stats
College stats

Living people
1964 births
Players of American football from Alabama
American football defensive backs
Canadian football defensive backs
African-American players of American football
African-American players of Canadian football
California Golden Bears football players
Winnipeg Blue Bombers players
BC Lions players
Sportspeople from Selma, Alabama
21st-century African-American people
20th-century African-American sportspeople